People's Republic of China – Norway relations officially started on 7 October 1950 and shortly after established diplomatic missions on 5 October 1954

History 
The first Norwegian diplomatic mission was founded 1851 during the union of Sweden and Norway. This was established in Guangzhou. In 1853, a new vice consulate was set up in Shanghai. By 1863, Shanghai became the Consulate General and the branch in Guangzhou was relegated into a vice consulate.

It was not until 1905 when Norway was split from the union with Sweden it had its own diplomatic mission in China. A year later, the first official visit from the Qing Empire took place with Dai Hongci, chairman for the Imperial Court's Cultural Department.

Recent Bilateral relations 
The commencement of diplomatic relations between the two countries nearly 60 years ago has progressed from cultural and political exchanges to trade ties such as economy, industry and technology.

In 2003, the volume of the bilateral trade between China and Norway was US$1.76 billion. Bilateral trade has steadily increased over the years.

In 2008, the export value from Norway to China is $1.93 billion and exports from China to Norway were up to $5.43 billion. In 2009, Norway's exports to China increased by 39 percent to a value of $2.28 billion. Exports, consisting of equipment, chemicals, optical and medical appliances, have gone up. China's exports to Norway amount to some $5.25 billion, increasing by 4.5 percent from last year.

China's largest exports to Norway were ships, textiles and garments, and mechanical and electronic products.

Norway's largest exports to China were crude oil, mechanical and electrical products, fertilizer, construction, mining equipment, factory and plant equipment, and salmon, as well as raw metals.

2010: Nobel Peace Prize 

The Chinese-Norwegian relationship ran into a large setback in 2010 because the Norwegian parliament-appointed Norwegian Nobel Committee awarded the prize to incarcerated Chinese human rights activist, Liu Xiaobo.  China reacted strongly, saying that relations between their two countries had been damaged. A planned meeting in Beijing between Norwegian Fisheries Minister Lisbeth Berg-Hansen and Chinese food control authorities was cancelled at the last minute, ostensibly because their counterparts had "other engagements"; Norwegian officials said that a meeting due to be held the same day between Berg-Hansen and the Chinese vice-minister for fisheries had been cancelled in reaction to the award. Elsewhere, performances of a Norwegian musical scheduled for the following month starring Alexander Rybak, winner of the Eurovision Song Contest 2009, also fell victim to the diplomatic fallout, according to the musical's composer. In early December, Norway announced that its bilateral trade talks with China had been indefinitely put on hold. Haakon Hjelde, Norway's negotiator alleged the postponement was not directly linked to the award, but Henning Kristofferson, director of international relations of the BI Norwegian School of Management, was certain that this was a retaliatory move. He said that Beijing had been "very clear that the prize was a big mistake and that it would damage relations."

2011 
Press secretary of Norway's foreign ministry (Hilde Steinfeld) confirmed in November 2011, the absence of bilateral talks during the last 12 months.

The finance committee of Norway's parliament, cancelled its planned trip (studiereise) to China in spring 2012, after not having secured appointments with any leading government representatives of China.

The newspaper Klassekampen wrote that Norwegian "war ships are being directed to Northern areas (nordområdene) because nations like Russia and China are showing increased interest for the natural resources of the North. – This is an important region for resources, and a number of nations are showing their interest there, but there is no imminent threat, says Minister of Defence Espen Barth Eide".

2013 
The standoff continues into 2013 with unofficial Chinese restrictions on Norwegian salmon and visas and China comparing Norway's action to a noose around the tiger's neck.

2014 
A 22 April 2014 NRK article said that by not having Norwegian officials meet with Dalai Lama during his upcoming visit, "one sends a quite unfortunate signal, not only to Chinese authorities but to people in Tibet who are exposed to ever increasing repression". A same day Dagbladet op-ed said that "We, as a nation, come across as being led by a president of parliament (and a Government?) that live by the moral [that] the brakkebaronene lived by during the war: Close the eyes for violations of human rights, forget the occupation, money trumphs [or decides]".

2016 
Norway and China normalized its diplomatic and political bilateral relations, which had been frozen since 2010 when Liu Xiaobo received the Nobel Peace Prize.

2019 

In July 2019, the UN ambassadors from 22 nations, including Norway, signed a joint letter to the UNHRC condemning China's mistreatment of the Uyghurs as well as its mistreatment of other minority groups, urging the Chinese government to close the Xinjiang re-education camps.

See also 
 Norway–Taiwan relations

References

External links 
 Hellstrom, J. (2014) China’s Political Priorities in the Nordic Countries, Swedish Defence Research Agency (FOI) 
Chinese Embassy in Norway 
Royal Norwegian Embassy 

 
Norway
Bilateral relations of Norway